Tsubakuro may refer to:
Mount Tsubakuro
 Tsubakuro, a great dane in the manga Kacchū no Senshi Gamu
Tsubakuro Jinnai of the television series Sanbiki ga Kiru!
Tsubakuro Swallow, the mascot of the Tokyo Yakult Swallows baseball team